East/West: Journal of Ukrainian Studies is a peer-reviewed academic journal covering Ukrainian studies published by the Canadian Institute of Ukrainian Studies (University of Alberta). The journal was established by George S. N. Luckyj. Originally titled Journal of Ukrainian Graduate Studies, the name was changed in 1976 to Journal of Ukrainian Studies, finally obtaining its current name in 2014.

References

External links

Publications established in 1976
Ukrainian studies journals
Biannual journals
English-language journals
University of Alberta